Victor Township may refer to the following places in the United States:

 Victor Township, DeKalb County, Illinois
 Victor Township, Osborne County, Kansas
 Victor Township, Clinton County, Michigan
 Victor Township, Wright County, Minnesota
 Victor Township, Towner County, North Dakota
 Victor Township, McClain County, Oklahoma
 Victor Township, Marshall County, South Dakota
 Victor Township, Roberts County, South Dakota

See also

Victor (disambiguation)
Victoria Township (disambiguation)
Victory Township (disambiguation)

Township name disambiguation pages